Kendrick Shamar Brown (born October 24, 1989) is an American professional basketball player for KB Trepça of the Kosovo Basketball Superleague. He plays at the point guard position.

High school career
Brown played high school basketball at Soldan High School in St. Louis, Missouri. He was ranked as the No. 206 player in Missouri.

Professional career
After going undrafted in the 2012 NBA draft, Brown signed with the Latvian club Jūrmala for the 2012–13 Latvian Basketball League season. The following season, he joined Norrköping Dolphins of the Swedish Basketligan.

For the 2015–16 season, Brown signed with Donar Groningen. On October 6, 2015, he recorded a triple double in a 122–57 win against BS Weert, with 18 points, 17 assists and 10 rebounds. On December 14, Donar bought Brown out.

In January 2016, Brown signed with BC Lietuvos rytas in Lithuania. On June 20, he left the team.

On July 19, 2016, Brown signed with Koroivos Amaliadas of the Greek Basket League. He left Koroivos after appearing in twelve games. On December 28, 2016, he signed with Al Riyadi Beirut of the Lebanese Basketball League.

On July 13, 2017, Brown signed with Aurora Basket Jesi on the Italian second division (Serie A2 East). On January 9, 2018, he parted ways with Jesi after averaging 19.3 points, 3.7 rebounds and 4.6 assists per game. Seven days later, he signed with Latvian club VEF Rīga for the rest of the season.

Brown signed with Lithuanian team Dzūkija on August 22, 2018.

In the 2018–19 season, Brown played with Russian club BC Parma of the VTB United League. On May 21, 2019, Brown signed with Nantes of the French LNB Pro B, the national second-tier league. The signing was remarkable as Brown was signed for the last game of the season for Nantes. He went on to score 13 points in his only match with the team.

On July 28, 2019, Brown returned to Lithuania by signing with Lietkabelis.

On November 28, 2019, Brown signed with Aris Thessaloniki in Greece. He averaged 13.7 points and 3.2 assists per game. On September 10, 2020, Brown signed with Larisa. On April 3, 2021, Brown parted ways with the Greek club.

On July 2, 2021, Brown signed with Atomerőmű SE of the Hungarian Nemzeti Bajnokság I/A.

On January, 2023, Brown signed with KB Trepça in Kosovo.

References

External links
 RealGM.com profile

1989 births
Living people
Al Riyadi Club Beirut basketball players
American expatriate basketball people in the Dominican Republic
American expatriate basketball people in Greece
American expatriate basketball people in Hungary
American expatriate basketball people in Italy
American expatriate basketball people in Latvia
American expatriate basketball people in Lebanon
American expatriate basketball people in Lithuania
American expatriate basketball people in the Netherlands
American expatriate basketball people in Poland
American expatriate basketball people in Russia
American expatriate basketball people in Sweden
American men's basketball players
Atomerőmű SE players
Basketball players from St. Louis
BC Dzūkija players
BC Rytas players
BK Jūrmala players
BK VEF Rīga players
Cerritos Falcons men's basketball players
Donar (basketball club) players
Dutch Basketball League players
Hermine Nantes Basket players
Junior college men's basketball players in the United States
Koroivos B.C. players
Larisa B.C. players
MKS Dąbrowa Górnicza (basketball) players
Norrköping Dolphins players
Parma Basket players
Philander Smith Panthers men's basketball players
Point guards
Southwest Tennessee Community College alumni
Western Kentucky Hilltoppers basketball players